KF Klosi is an Albanian football club based in Klos. They are currently competing in the Kategoria e Tretë.

References

Klosi
Klos (municipality)
Albanian Third Division clubs
Kategoria e Dytë clubs